Pedro Pablo Braojos de Santiago (born 8 January 1957) is a Spanish retired footballer who played as a forward, and a current manager.

Club career
Braojos was born in Toledo, Castile-La Mancha. An Atlético Madrid's youth graduate, he only appeared with the B-side in Segunda División B and Segunda División; he made his debut in the latter competition on 7 September 1980, starting and scoring his side's only in a 1–1 away draw against Racing de Santander.

After two years in the third level appearing for Lorca Deportiva CF and SD Huesca, Braojos joined Real Oviedo in the second division in the 1983 summer. He only appeared sparingly for the Asturians, and subsequently resumed his career in the lower leagues, representing Granada CF, Real Balompédica Linense and CP Villarrobledo; he retired with the latter in 1990, aged 33.

Managerial career
After being an interim manager at second level's CD Toledo in 1996, Braojos was appointed manager of fellow league team UD Almería in the following year, remaining in charge for 14 matches and suffering team relegation. He subsequently achieved mid-table positions in the following five campaigns, while in charge of CD Leganés, Sporting de Gijón, Real Jaén and Real Murcia.

In 2005 Braojos was named CD Linares manager. He led the club to three consecutive play-offs, but failed to achieve promotion in any of them.

On 16 October 2008 Braojos was appointed at the helm of Granada CF, in the third division. He left the club at the end of his contract, and remained two further years without any club.

On 14 June 2011 Braojos was appointed CP Cacereño manager. After finishing 7th, nine points shy of the play-offs, he left the club.

References

External links

Soccerway profile

1957 births
Living people
Sportspeople from Toledo, Spain
Spanish footballers
Footballers from Castilla–La Mancha
Segunda División players
Segunda División B players
Tercera División players
Atlético Madrid B players
Lorca Deportiva CF footballers
SD Huesca footballers
Real Oviedo players
Granada CF footballers
Real Balompédica Linense footballers
Spanish football managers
Segunda División managers
CD Toledo managers
UD Almería managers
Sporting de Gijón managers
Real Jaén managers
CD Leganés managers
Real Murcia managers
Granada CF managers
CP Cacereño managers
Association football forwards